Sustainable Cleveland (also called Sustainable Cleveland 2019) is a program developed by the city of Cleveland, Ohio in the United States. It aims to make Cleveland a sustainable city by the year 2019. Each year the program focuses on a specific initiative. It was started by Cleveland mayor Frank G. Jackson in 2009. Twenty-five people were appointed to the program council by Jackson. Andrew Watterson was named, by Jackson, Cleveland's Chief of Sustainability and the head of Sustainable Cleveland in 2009. Jenita McGowan replaced Watterson in 2012.

The 2012 initiative focused on improving the amount of local food produced, sold to the public, and used by restaurants. Sustainable Cleveland holds an annual summit, focused on year-specific initiatives including local food growth and renewable energy. Jeremy Rifkin, David Cooperrider, and Kathleen Merrigan have spoken at the summit.

The 2013 Summit will focus on Advanced and Renewable Energy. The following topics correspond to future years:

2014 – Waste
2015 – Clean Water
2016 – Transportation 
2017 – Green Space
2018 – Neighborhoods
2019 - People

Sustainable Cleveland is also driven by working groups, which form from annual summits.

References

External links
Official website

Government of Cleveland
Sustainability in the United States